Francisco "Paquito" Fernández Ochoa (25 February 1950 – 6 November 2006) was a World Cup alpine ski racer from Spain. Born in Madrid and raised north of the city in Cercedilla, he was the eldest of eight children whose father ran a ski school. Paquito raced in all of the alpine disciplines and specialized in slalom.

At the age of 21, he won an Olympic gold medal in the slalom at the 1972 Winter Olympics in Sapporo, Japan.  He is known for being the first and only Spaniard to win a gold medal at the Winter Olympics.

Career
Fernández Ochoa made his international debut at age 17 at the 1968 Winter Olympics, where he finished 38th in the downhill and giant slalom, and 23rd in the slalom.  His first top ten finish on the World Cup circuit was the following season, a sixth-place finish in the slalom at Megève, France, on January 26, 1969.

He was one of five siblings that raced for the Spanish alpine ski team and competed at the Winter Olympics (brothers Luís and Juan Manuel and sisters Dolores and Blanca). Blanca was the only other Spanish skier to win a medal at the Winter Olympics; she won the bronze in the women's slalom at the 1992 Winter Olympics in Albertville, France.  

Fernández Ochoa competed in four Winter Olympics (1968-80). He won only one World Cup race, a slalom in 1974 in Zakopane, Poland.  Both of his career wins came over Gustav Thöni of Italy, the dominant technical ski racer of the early 1970s.

At the 1974 World Championships, Fernández Ochoa won a bronze medal in the slalom.  His best season was 1975; he finished 9th in the overall standings and 7th in the slalom standings.  He finished ninth in the slalom at the 1976 Winter Olympics.

Fernández Ochoa retired from international competition at age 30, following the 1980 World Cup season, and finished with four World Cup podiums (top 3) and 30 top ten finishes.  He then raced for several seasons on the pro tour in North America.

Fernández Ochoa died of lymphatic cancer at age 56 in Cercedilla, Community of Madrid in November 2006. Less than two weeks before his death, a statue of him was erected in Cercedilla.  He was survived by his wife María Jesús Vargas (m. 1973) and their three children: Bárbara, Paula, and Francisco.

Francisco Fernández Ochoa City Ice Rink in Valdemoro, Madrid and Francisco Fernández Ochoa City Sports Center in Carabanchel, Madrid were named in his honor.

World Cup results

Season standings

Points were only awarded for top ten finishes thru 1979, top 15 thru 1991 (see scoring system).

Race podiums
1 win (1 SL)
4 podiums (2 SL, 2 K)

World Championship results 

From 1948 through 1980, the Winter Olympics were also the World Championships for alpine skiing.
At the World Championships from 1954 through 1980, the combined was a "paper race" using the results of the three events (DH, GS, SL).

Olympic results

Notes

See also
 List of flag bearers for Spain at the Olympics
 List of Olympic medalist families

References

External links

 
 Francisco Fernandez Ochoa World Cup standings at the International Ski Federation
 
 
  - 1972 Winter Olympics - Men's Slalom - Gold medal second run - from Japanese television - 1972-02-13
 Obituary for Francisco Fernández Ochoa - 2006-11-06 at elmundo.es 
 Coverage of funeral of Francisco Fernández Ochoa - 2006-11-07 at elmundo.es 

Spanish male alpine skiers
Olympic gold medalists for Spain
Olympic alpine skiers of Spain
Alpine skiers at the 1968 Winter Olympics
Alpine skiers at the 1972 Winter Olympics
Alpine skiers at the 1976 Winter Olympics
Alpine skiers at the 1980 Winter Olympics
Sportspeople from Madrid
Deaths from cancer in Spain
1950 births
2006 deaths
Deaths from lymphoma
Olympic medalists in alpine skiing
Medalists at the 1972 Winter Olympics